"Crying My Heart Out for You" (not to be confused with the Ricky Skaggs song "Crying My Heart Out Over You") was the third single of Neil Sedaka immediately following the success of his debut single "The Diary" and follow-up single "I Go Ape." The hit written by Neil Sedaka was released in 1959 reaching No. 111 on the US Billboard Chart. It was more successful in Italy, where the record hit No. 6. The record's commercial failure nearly prompted RCA Records to drop Sedaka from its roster; after Sedaka begged the company for a second chance, he took the opportunity to analyze the popular music of the day and wrote "Oh! Carol," beginning a five-year string of hit singles that would continue until the British Invasion.

References

1959 singles
Neil Sedaka songs
Songs written by Neil Sedaka
Songs with lyrics by Howard Greenfield
1959 songs